The Minister for Social Services is the Australian federal government minister who oversees Australian Government social services, including mental health, families and children's policy, and support for carers and people with disabilities, and seniors. Amanda Rishworth was appointed as minister on 1 June 2022, following the Australian federal election in 2022.

Portfolio
In the Government of Australia, the Ministers administer the portfolio through the Department of Social Services. Other portfolio bodies for which the Ministers are responsible include:
 Aged Care Standards and Accreditation Agency
 Australian Institute of Family Studies
 Commonwealth Advisory Committee on Homelessness
 Community and Disability Services Ministers' Conference
 Community Services Ministers' Advisory Council
 Emergency Relief State Advisory Committees
 National Childcare Accreditation Council Inc.
 National Disability Advisory Council
 National Disability Insurance Agency
 National Supported Accommodation Assistance Program (SAAP) Coordination and Development Committee (CAD) representatives and Information Sub-committee
 Social Security Appeals Tribunal

List of ministers for social services
The following individuals have been appointed as Minister for Social Services, or any of its precedent titles:

Assistant ministers

List of Assistant Ministers for Social Services

The following individuals have been appointed as Assistant Minister for Social Services, or any precedent titles:

List of Assistant Ministers for the Prevention of Family Violence
The following individuals have been appointed as Assistant Minister for the Prevention of Family Violence, or any of its precedent titles:

Former portfolio ministers

List of ministers for major projects

List of ministers for urban development

List of ministers for aged care
Ministers for aged care or ageing were appointed from 1988 to 1993 and again from 1998 to 2013. The portfolio gained a mental health component in 2010. The latter returned to the health portfolio in 2013, with ageing moving to social services. The following individuals have been appointed as Minister for Mental Health and Ageing, or any of its precedent titles: The Turnbull Government transferred the aged care portfolio back to the Department of Health in October 2015.

List of ministers for community services
A separate outer ministry role of the Minister for Community Services existed between January 2006 and December 2007, supplementing the cabinet role of the Minister for Families, Community Services and Indigenous Affairs.

List of Assistant Ministers for Children and Families
The following individuals have been appointed as Assistant Minister for Children and Families, or any precedent titles:

References

External links
 

Social Services